Parafomoria liguricella is a moth of the family Nepticulidae. It is found in the Italian Riviera and the Spanish Mediterranean coast. It is probably also present in France, Portugal and North Africa.

The length of the forewings is 1.7-1.85 mm for males and 1.3-2.2 mm for females. Adults are on wing from May to June. There is probably one generation per year.

The larvae feed on Cistus albidus. They mine the leaves of their host plant. The mine consists of a very narrow, much contorted corridor, forming a quite small secondary blotch in the end. Sometimes though, the mine is less contorted and the corridor follows a vein. The frass is deposited in a thick broken central line. Pupation takes place outside of the mine.

External links
Fauna Europaea
bladmineerders.nl
The Cistaceae-feeding Nepticulidae (Lepidoptera) of the western Palaearctic region

Nepticulidae
Moths of Europe
Moths of Africa
Moths described in 1946